The NSW AAGPS (Athletic Association of the Great Public Schools) Athletics is one of the premier Athletics events in Australia. It is an annual event competed in between 9 member teams that include Saint Ignatius Riverview, St Joseph's Hunters Hill, Sydney Grammar, Sydney Boys High, Newington College, Scots College, The King's School, Sydney Church Of England (Shore), and The Armidale School.

The Event takes place at Sydney Olympic Park Athletic Centre and attracts crowds up to 15,000 people. It is regarded as one of the largest Athletics meets in the Southern Hemisphere

History

The official athletics competition commenced in 1892. In 1912 the competition was divided into two levels – Senior and Junior. In 2012 a third level, intermediate, was added.
 Senior Championship Shield for Athletics first awarded in 1895. In 1908 a new Senior Shield replaced a previous trophy which was full having been first presented in 1873 when a race for All Schools was first held at each School carnival. The new Shield was back dated to 1895. The current holders of 2022 are The King's School.
 The Intermediate Championship for Athletics first awarded in 2012 to The King's School. The current holders of 2018 are The King's School.
 Junior Athletic Championship AAAGPS  first awarded in 1912 and presented to Athletic Association of the Great Public Schools of NSW 11 May 1895. Engraved on the back is The Ladies Challenge Plate. The current holders of 2022 are The King's School.

Results

Senior Championship Shield for Athletics (1995-2018)

Records

Opens Records

Open 100m: Toluta'u Koula (rugby league), Newington College 10.58 2019

Open 110m Hurdles: Nick Andrews, The King's School 14.06 2015

Open 200m:  John Gikas, The King's School 21.40 2016

Open 400m: Louis Stenmark, Saint Ignatius' College 47.58 2014 

Open 800m: Lachlan Renshaw, Sydney Grammar School 1:50.63 2005

Open 1500m: Jack Stapleton, The King's School 3:52.98 2013

Open 3000m: Morgan McDonald, Newington College  8:30.60 2013

Open Long Jump:  J.M. McCann, St Joseph's College  7.42m 1957

Open High Jump:  J. Maloney/Harrison Day, St. Joseph's College  2.11m 1995/2014

Open Shot Put: Tepai Moeroa, Newington College   18.22m 2013

Senior 4x400 Relay:  Sydney Grammar School  3:21.40 2004

Open 4x100 Relay:  The King's School  41.75 2017 

Under 17 Records

U17 100m: Henry Hutchison, Saint Ignatius College 10.79 2014

U17 110m Hurdles: Nick Andrews, The King's School 13.45 2014

U17 200m:  Nick Andrews, The King's School 21.87 2014

U17 400m: Louis Stenmark, Saint Ignatius' College 46.80 2015 

U17 800m: Matthew Scott, The Scots College 1:53.26 2014

U17 1500m: L.S. McSpeerin, Shore 4:02.92 1997

U17 Long Jump:  Lachlan Westhoff, Shore 7.10m 2006

U17 High Jump:  Christopher Dwyer, Saint Ignatius College  2.09m 2014

U17 Shot Put: Tepai Moeroa, Newington College   19.12m 2012

U17 4x100 Relay:  The King's School   42.61 2016 

Under 16 Records

U16 100m: Louis Stenmark, Saint Ignatius' College 10.87 2014

U16 110m Hurdles: Ivan Metcalf, Sydney Boys High School 14.52 2011

U16 200m:  Alexander Fitzpatrick, Saint Ignatius College 22.33 2014

U16 400m: A.W. Bursill, Sydney Grammar School 50.34 1986 

U16 800m: G.J. Halpin, Newington College 1:55.80 1971

U16 1500m: J. Johnson, Saint Ignatius' College 4:07.70 2008

U16 Long Jump:  M. Hulme, St Joseph's College  6.81m 2009

U16 High Jump:  J. M. Lodge, Sydney Boys High 2.00m 1997

U16 Shot Put: Tepai Moeroa, Newington College   17.61m 2011

Intermediate 4x400 Relay :  Newington College  3:30.32 2011

U16 4x100 Relay:  The King's School  43.49 2016

See also
 Athletic Association of the Great Public Schools of New South Wales
 AAGPS (NSW) Basketball
 AAGPS (NSW) Soccer
 Head of the River (New South Wales)

References

GPS Athletics Results Archive 
GPS Athletics results 2016 
AAGPS Premiership History
Trophies

Athletic Association of the Great Public Schools of New South Wales